The 1956 United States presidential election in Maryland took place on November 6, 1956, as part of the 1956 United States presidential election. State voters chose nine representatives, or electors, to the Electoral College, who voted for president and vice president.

Maryland was won by incumbent President Dwight D. Eisenhower (R–Pennsylvania), running with Vice President Richard Nixon, with 60.00% of the popular vote, against Adlai Stevenson (D–Illinois), running with Senator Estes Kefauver, with 39.94% of the popular vote.

By winning all 24 county-equivalents, Eisenhower became and remains the solitary presidential candidate to sweep all Maryland's counties and Baltimore City. As of the 2020 election, this is the last election in which the City of Baltimore voted for a Republican presidential candidate, and by extension, the last election in which a presidential candidate won all of the state's counties. Eisenhower is also the last Republican to carry the state twice, as it would vote Republican 3 more times after this election, all in Republican electoral landslides (1972, 1984, and 1988). 

George Washington in 1792 is the only other candidate who swept all of Maryland's existing counties, though at the time several did not yet exist. In 1789 and 1820, the other two elections in which a candidate ran virtually unopposed, unpledged slates of electors ran as opposition in both elections: Anti-Federalist electors in 1789, and Federalist electors in 1820. These electors supported Washington and James Monroe, but supported different vice presidential candidates. Thus, it is a debatable topic whether these count as total sweeps or not (In 1789, the Anti-Federalist electors won Baltimore and Anne Arundel county, and in 1820 St. Mary's and Charles counties). Nevertheless, Eisenhower remains the only candidate in the modern party system to win all of Maryland's counties, and the only to win all of the presently existing ones.

As of 2020, this is the last election in which Maryland voted for the Republican while Missouri voted for the Democrat.

Results

Results by county

Counties that flipped from Republican to Democratic
Baltimore (City)

See also
 United States presidential elections in Maryland
 1956 United States presidential election
 1956 United States elections

Notes

References 

Maryland
1956
Presidential